Boleslas Gajewski, son of Vincent Gajewski (the president of the ˝Committee for study and progress of Solresol˝), was the author of the grammar of the musical language Solresol, published in 1902.

Works
Grammaire du Solresol, ou langue universelle de Fr. Sudre. Paris, 1902.

External links
Grammar of Solresol

Linguists from France
Speakers of international auxiliary languages
Year of death missing
Year of birth missing